Derek Robert Sage (born October 11, 1978) is an American football coach. He the offensive coordinator and tight ends coach at University of Nevada, Reno, a position he has held since 2022.

Early life
Sage was born on October 11, 1978, in Ventura County, California. In his high school years, Sage lived in Sparks, Nevada and attended Edward C. Reed High School.

Playing career
Sage played as a tight end for the Sacramento City College football team in the 1998 and 1999 seasons. While Sage was at Sacramento C.C., his team won conference championships and bowl championships. Sage then transferred to Cal State Northridge. He played there as a tight end in 2000 and 2001—the program's final two seasons—and earned his bachelor's degree in kinesiology in 2002.

Coaching career

Nevada (first stint)
Sage embarked on his coaching career in 2003 as a graduate assistant at Nevada. He spent two seasons with the program, working with defensive backs in 2003 and with wide receivers in 2004.

New Hampshire
In 2005, Sage landed his first job as a wide receivers coach at New Hampshire, where he first met Chip Kelly, who was offensive coordinator at the time of Sage's hire. Sage mentored All-American receiver David Ball, who became the NCAA career leader in touchdown receptions, with 58, and amassed 4,655 receiving yards in his collegiate career—a school record for New Hampshire.

Wyoming
Following a five-year stint at New Hampshire, Sage became the wide receivers coach at Wyoming in 2010. At Wyoming, Sage mentored future NFL Draft pick Robert Herron. Sage coached four all-conference receivers during his time with the Cowboys, which lasted from 2010 to 2013.

Toledo
In 2014, Sage became the wide receivers coach at Toledo, where he coached for three seasons. In 2016, Sage's third and final season with the Rockets, Sage oversaw a receiving corps that featured two All-Mid-American Conference receivers. The Rockets ranked seventh in the NCAA in total offense that season, averaging 517.8 yards of offense per game. The Rockets' passing offense that season averaged 322.8 yards per game, which was an improvement of over 88 yards per game from Sage's first season (2014).

Washington State
Sage accepted his first Power Five job in 2017, becoming the inside receivers coach at Washington State, which ran an air raid offense under head coach Mike Leach. The Cougars' passing offense ranked second in the nation and first in the Pac-12 Conference in 2017, with 366.8 yards per game, and it led the Pac-12 in touchdown passes.

UCLA
In 2018, Sage reunited with Chip Kelly when he was hired as the tight ends coach at UCLA. In his inaugural season at UCLA, Sage mentored future NFL Draft pick Caleb Wilson, who led the nation's tight ends in receptions per game, receiving yards per game, and total receiving yards. His 965 receiving yards on the season were the most ever for a UCLA tight end.

In 2019, Sage stayed on as tight ends coach and assumed responsibilities as the team's special teams coordinator following the departure of special teams coordinator Roy Manning.

Nevada (second stint)
Following the 2021 season, Sage joined Ken Wilson's inaugural staff at Nevada as the offensive coordinator.

Personal life
Sage is married to Mandy Sage (née Jeskey), with whom he has a daughter, Piper, and a son, Casen.

References

External links
 Nevada profile

1978 births
Living people
American football tight ends
Cal State Northridge Matadors football players
Nevada Wolf Pack football coaches
New Hampshire Wildcats football coaches
Toledo Rockets football coaches
UCLA Bruins football coaches
Washington State Cougars football coaches
Wyoming Cowboys football coaches
People from Sparks, Nevada
Sportspeople from Ventura County, California
Coaches of American football from Nevada
Players of American football from Nevada